This is a list of foreign players in the Scottish Premiership, which commenced play in 2013. The following players meet both of the following criteria:
 Have played at least one Scottish Premiership game. Players who were signed by Scottish Premiership clubs, but only played in lower league, cup and/or European games, or did not play in any competitive games at all, are not included.
 Are foreign, i.e., outside Great Britain and Ireland, determined by the following:
A player is considered foreign if his allegiance is not to play for the national teams of Scotland, England, Wales, Northern Ireland or the Republic of Ireland.

In bold: players who have played at least one Scottish Premiership game in the current season (2022–23), and are still at a club for which they have played. This does not include current players of a Scottish Premiership club who have not played a Scottish Premiership game in the current season.

Details correct as of 21 August 2022



Albania

Flo Bojaj - Kilmarnock - 2016–17
Eros Grezda - Rangers- 2018–20
Egli Kaja - Livingston - 2018
Ylber Ramadani - Aberdeen - 2022–present

Algeria

Ismaël Bouzid - Kilmarnock - 2013–14

Angola

Joaquim Adão - Heart of Midlothian - 2018
Genséric Kusunga - Dundee - 2018–19
Dolly Menga - Livingston - 2018–20

Antigua and Barbuda

Zaine Francis-Angol - Motherwell - 2013–15
Josh Parker - Aberdeen - 2015–16

Argentina
Alexandro Bernabei - Celtic - 2022–present
Antonio Rojano - Hamilton Academical - 2017–18
Adrián Spörle - Dundee United - 2020–22

Australia

Daniel Arzani - Celtic - 2018–2020
Nathaniel Atkinson - Hearts of Midlothian - 2021–present
Keanu Baccus - St Mirren - 2022–present
Aziz Behich - Dundee United - 2022–present
Mark Birighitti - Dundee United
Martin Boyle - Dundee, Hibernian - 2013–present
Oliver Bozanic - Heart of Midlothian - 2018–20
Phillip Cancar - Livingston - 2022–present
Jesse Curran - Dundee - 2015–19
Cameron Devlin - Heart of Midlothian - 2021–
Ryan Edwards - Heart of Midlothian, Partick Thistle, St Mirren - 2015–19
Ben Garuccio - Heart of Midlothian - 2018–20
Curtis Good - Dundee United - 2014
Jackson Irvine - Celtic, Kilmarnock, Ross County - 2013–16
James Jeggo - Hibernian - 2023-
Garang Kuol - Heart of Midlothian - 2023-
Aaron Lennox - Aberdeen - 2016–17
Jamie Maclaren - Hibernian - 2018–19
Ashley Maynard-Brewer - Ross County - 2021
Scott McDonald - Motherwell and Dundee United - 2015–17, 2017–18
Dylan McGowan - Heart of Midlothian - 2013–14
Ryan McGowan - Dundee and Dundee United, St Johnstone - 2015–16, 2019, 2022–present
Matthew Millar - St Mirren - 2021–22
Lewis Miller - Hibernian - 2022–present
Mark Milligan - Hibernian - 2018–2019
Aaron Mooy - Celtic - 2022–present
Tom Rogic - Celtic - 2013–22
Andy Rose - Motherwell - 2017–18
Kye Rowles - Heart of Midlothian - 2022–present
Harry Souttar - Dundee United and Ross County - 2015–16, 2018
Ryan Strain - St Mirren - 2022–present
Adam Taggart - Dundee United - 2015–16

Austria

Daniel Bachmann - Ross County and Kilmarnock - 2015, 2018–19
Moritz Bauer - Celtic - 2019–20
Darko Bodul - Dundee United - 2015–16
David Cancola - Ross County - 2021–present
Peter Haring - Heart of Midlothian - 2018–present

Belgium

Logan Bailly - Celtic - 2015–17
Boli Bolingoli-Mbombo - Celtic - 2019–20
Dedryck Boyata - Celtic - 2015–19
Rocky Bushiri - Hibernian - 2022–present
Allan Delferrière - Hibernian - 2022–present
Jason Denayer - Celtic - 2014–15
Lars Dendoncker - St Johnstone - 2021–22
Tim Dreesen - Ross County - 2014
Frédéric Frans - Partick Thistle - 2014–16
Charly Musonda - Celtic - 2018
Funso Ojo - Aberdeen - 2019–21
Kazeem Olaigbe - Ross County - 2022–present
Stéphane Oméonga - Hibernian, Livingston - 2019–present

Bosnia and Herzegovina

Bahrudin Atajić - Celtic - 2013–14
Sanel Jahić - St Johnstone - 2013–14

Brazil

Alexandre D'Acol - Hamilton Academical - 2015–17
Lucas - Hamilton Academical - 2015–16
Igor Rossi - Heart of Midlothian - 2015–17

Bulgaria

Kostadin Gadzhalov - Dundee - 2015–18
Viktor Genev - St Mirren - 2015
Plamen Krachunov - St Johnstone - 2016
Aleksandar Tonev - Celtic - 2014–15

Burundi

Gaël Bigirimana - Motherwell and Hibernian - 2017–19

Cameroon

Stéphane Bahoken - St Mirren - 2013–14
Eric Djemba-Djemba - St Mirren - 2014
Arnaud Djoum - Heart of Midlothian, Dundee United - 2015–19, 2022–present
Jeando Fuchs - Dundee United - 2020–22
Yann Songo'o - Ross County - 2014

Canada

Scott Arfield - Rangers - 2018–present
Theo Bair - St Johnstone - 2022–present
Dylan Carreiro - Dundee - 2014–15
Jay Chapman - Dundee - 2022
Terry Dunfield - Ross County - 2014–15
Calum Ferguson - Inverness Caledonian Thistle - 2015–16
Marcus Godinho - Heart of Midlothian - 2018–19
Marcus Haber - Dundee - 2016–19
Victor Loturi - Ross County - 2022–present
Alistair Johnston - Celtic - 2023-
Liam Millar - Kilmarnock - 2019–20
Harry Paton - Ross County - 2018–22
Ben Paton - Ross County - 2021–present
Charlie Trafford - Hamilton Academical - 2020–21
David Wotherspoon - St Johnstone - 2013–present
Dario Zanatta - Heart of Midlothian - 2015–19

Cape Verde

Luís 'Duk' Lopes - Aberdeen - 2022–present
David Silva - Kilmarnock - 2013–14

Chinese Taipei

Tim Chow - Ross County - 2016–18

Colombia
Cristian Montaño - Livingston - 2021–present
Alfredo Morelos - Rangers - 2017–present

Congo

Dylan Bahamboula - Livingston - 2022–present
Scott Bitsindou - Livingston - 2022–present
Clévid Dikamona - Heart of Midlothian - 2018–present

Congo DR

Beni Baningime - Heart of Midlothian - 2021–
Youssouf Mulumbu - Celtic, Kilmarnock - 2017–19
Andréa Mbuyi-Mutombo - Inverness Caledonian Thistle - 2015–16
Delphin Tshiembe - Hamilton Academical - 2018–19
Calvin Zola - Aberdeen - 2013–14

Costa Rica

Cristian Gamboa - Celtic - 2016–19

Croatia

Borna Barišić – Rangers - 2018–present
Filip Benković -  Celtic - 2018–19
Marijan Cabraja - Hibernian - 2022–present
Antonio Čolak - Rangers - 2022–present
Josip Juranović -  Celtic - 2021–present
Christian Ilić - Motherwell - 2019–20
Nikola Katić - Rangers - 2018–present
Niko Kranjčar - Rangers - 2016–18
Jozo Šimunović - Celtic - 2015–20

Curaçao

Kemy Agustien - Hamilton Academical - 2016
Juninho Bacuna - Rangers - 2021–22

Cyprus

Alex Gogić - Hamilton Academical, St Mirren - 2017–present

Czech Republic

Tomáš Černý - Partick Thistle, Aberdeen - 2015–21
Václav Hladký - St Mirren - 2019–20
Milan Nitrianský - Partick Thistle - 2017–2018
Nicolas Šumský - Hamilton Academical - 2015–16
Filip Twardzik - Celtic - 2013–15
Zdeněk Zlámal - Heart of Midlothian, St Mirren, St Johnstone - 2018–21

Denmark

Oliver Abildgaard - Celtic - 2022–present
Danny Amankwaa - Hearts - 2018–19
Nicolai Brock-Madsen - St Mirren - 2018
Thomas Mikkelsen - Ross County - 2017–18
Matt O'Riley - Celtic - 2022–present
Erik Sviatchenko - Celtic - 2016–18

Estonia

Henri Anier - Dundee United, Inverness Caledonian Thistle, Motherwell - 2013–14, 2015–16, 2017
Mattias Käit - Ross County - 2018
Henrik Ojamaa - Dundee, Motherwell - 2014–15, 2017
Madis Vihmann - St Johnstone - 2019–20

Faroe Islands

Gunnar Nielsen - Motherwell - 2013–15

Finland

Serge Atakayi - Rangers - 2016–2019
Alexei Eremenko - Kilmarnock - 2014–15
Carljohan Eriksson - Dundee United - 2022–present
Niko Hämäläinen - Kilmarnock - 2019–2020
Glen Kamara - Dundee, Rangers - 2017–present
Ilmari Niskanen - Dundee United - 2021–present
Juhani Ojala - Motherwell - 2021–present
Teemu Pukki - Celtic - 2013–14
Riku Riski - Dundee United - 2016
Eetu Vertainen - St Johnstone - 2021

France

Tony Andreu - Hamilton Academical, St Mirren, St Johnstone - 2014–15, 2019–21
Maxime Biamou - Dundee United - 2021–22
Dylan Bikey - Heart of Midlothian - 2017
Loïc Damour - Heart of Midlothian - 2019–21
Moussa Dembélé - Celtic - 2016–18
Oumar Diaby - Hamilton Academical - 2016
Oan Djorkaeff - St Mirren - 2019–20
Christopher Dilo - St Mirren - 2013–14
Odsonne Édouard - Celtic - 2017–21
Farid El Alagui - Dundee United - 2014
Faissal El Bakhtaoui - Dundee - 2016–19
Kévin Gomis - Dundee - 2016–17
William Gros - Kilmarnock - 2013–14
Christopher Jullien - Celtic - 2019–present
Karl Madianga - Dundee - 2018–19
Malaury Martin - Heart of Midlothian - 2017–19
David Milinković - Heart of Midlothian - 2017–18
Steven Mouyokolo - Celtic - 2013–14
Christian Nadé - Hamilton Academical - 2015–16
Aaron Nemane - Rangers - 2017
David N'Gog - Ross County - 2018
Elton Ngwatala - Dundee - 2018–19
Olivier Ntcham - Celtic - 2017–21
Cécé Pepe - Livingston - 2019–20
Florent Sinama Pongolle - Dundee United - 2015–16
Christopher Routis - Ross County - 2016–18
Xavier Tomas - Hamilton Academical - 2017–18
Élie Youan - Hibernian - 2022–present
Abdellah Zoubir - Hibernian - 2013–14

Gambia
Momodou Bojang - Hibernian - 2022–present

Germany

Adrian Beck - Hamilton Academical - 2019–20
Sean Goss - Rangers, St Johnstone, Motherwell - 2018, 2019, 2021–present
Moritz Jenz - Celtic - 2022–present
Orestis Kiomourtzoglou - Hearts of Midlothian - 2022–present
Thomas Konrad - Dundee - 2014–16
Gramoz Kurtaj - Hamilton Academical - 2015–17
Arvid Schenk - Dundee - 2014–15
Lennard Sowah - Hamilton Academical, Heart of Midlothian - 2016–17, 2018–19
Luka Tankulić - Dundee - 2014–15
Dan Twardzik - Motherwell - 2013–16
Luis Zwick - Dundee United - 2015–16

Ghana

Mathew Anim Cudjoe - Dundee United - 2021–present
Prince Buaben - Heart of Midlothian and Partick Thistle - 2014, 2015–18
Joe Dodoo - Rangers - 2016–19
Abdul Osman - Partick Thistle - 2014–18
Wakaso - Celtic - 2014–15

Greece

Tasos Avlonitis - Heart of Midlothian - 2016–17
Vasilis Barkas - Celtic - 2020–22
Giorgos Giakoumakis - Celtic - 2021–present
Evangelos Ikonomou - Ross County - 2014
Marios Ogkmpoe - Hamilton Academical - 2018–21
Georgios Samaras - Celtic - 2013–14
Georgios Sarris - Hamilton Academical - 2016–18
Giannis Skondras - Hamilton Academical - 2016–18
Alexandros Tziolis - Heart of Midlothian - 2017

Grenada

Regan Charles-Cook - Ross County - 2020
Anthony Straker - Motherwell - 2015

Guadeloupe

Mickaël Antoine-Curier - Hamilton Academical - 2014–15

Guinea

Lonsana Doumbouya - Inverness Caledonian Thistle - 2016–17
Mathias Pogba - Partick Thistle - 2015–16
Ibrahima Savane - Livingston - 2019

Guinea-Bissau

Amido Baldé- Celtic - 2013–15
Esmaël Gonçalves - Heart of Midlothian, Livingston - 2017–18, 2022–present

Honduras

Emilio Izaguirre - Celtic - 2013–17, 2018–19

Hungary

Ádám Bogdán - Hibernian - 2018–19

Iceland

Kári Árnason - Aberdeen - 2017–18

Iran

Alex Samizadeh - Kilmarnock - 2017–18

Israel

Liel Abada - Celtic - 2021–present
Hatem Abd Elhamed - Celtic - 2019–21
Nir Bitton - Celtic - 2013–22
Beram Kayal - Celtic - 2013–15
Ofir Marciano - Hibernian - 2017–21

Italy

Raffaele De Vita - Livingston and Ross County - 2015–16, 2018–19
Dario Del Fabro - Kilmarnock - 2019–20
Massimo Donati - Hamilton Academical and St Mirren - 2016–18
Manuel Pascali - Kilmarnock - 2013–15

Ivory Coast

Vakoun Issouf Bayo - Celtic - 2019–20
Souleymane Coulibaly - Kilmarnock - 2016–17
Guy Demel - Dundee United - 2015–16
Armand Gnanduillet - Heart of Midlothian - 2021–22
Cédric Kipré - Motherwell - 2017–18
Eboue Kouassi - Celtic - 2017–2020
Ismaila Soro - Celtic - 2020–22
Kolo Toure - Celtic - 2016–17

Jamaica

Rolando Aarons - Motherwell - 2019–2020, 2022–present
Junior Morias - St Mirren - 2019–present
Theo Robinson - Motherwell - 2015–16
Kemar Roofe - Rangers - 2020–

Japan

Kyogo Furuhashi - Celtic - 2021–present
Reo Hatate - Celtic - 2022–present
Yosuke Ideguchi - Celtic - 2022–present
Tomoki Iwata - Celtic - 2023-
Eiji Kawashima - Dundee United - 2015–16
Yuki Kobayashi - Celtic - 2023-
Daizen Maeda - Celtic - 2022–present
Ryotaro Meshino - Heart of Midlothian - 2019–20
Koki Mizuno - Celtic - 2008–10
Shunsuke Nakamura - Celtic - 2005–09
Yutaro Oda - Heart of Midlothian - 2023-

Kenya
Jonah Ayunga - St Mirren - 2022–present

Kosovo
Florent Hoti - Dundee United - 2020–22

Latvia

Antons Kurakins - Hamilton Academical - 2015–16
Vitālijs Maksimenko - Kilmarnock - 2014

Lithuania

Deivydas Matulevičius - Hibernian - 2017–18
Deimantas Petravičius - Motherwell - 2017–18
Darvydas Šernas - Ross County - 2015
Vykintas Slivka - Hibernian - 2017–20

Malta

Myles Beerman - Rangers - 2016–19
James Brown - Livingston, St Johnstone - 2018–19, 2021–present

Malawi

Kieran Ngwenya - Aberdeen - 2020–21

Mali

Lassana Coulibaly - Rangers - 2018–19

Martinique

Yoann Arquin - Ross County and St Mirren - 2014–15
Julien Faubert - Kilmarnock - 2016

Mexico

Gabriel - Partick Thistle - 2013–14
Eduardo Herrera - Rangers - 2017–20
Carlos Peña - Rangers - 2017–19

Montenegro

Sead Hakšabanović - Celtic - 2022–present

Montserrat

Donervon Daniels - Aberdeen - 2015

Morocco

Moha El Ouriachi - Heart of Midlothian - 2017
Faycal Rherras - Heart of Midlothian and Hibernian - 2016–17, 2018

Netherlands

Jordi Balk - Ross County - 2014
Vicente Besuijen - Aberdeen - 2022–present
Mario Bilate - Dundee United - 2014–15
Derk Boerrigter - Celtic - 2013–16
Melvin de Leeuw - Ross County - 2013–14
Dorus de Vries - Celtic - 2016–19
Mohamed El Makrini - Kilmarnock - 2019–20
Nigel Hasselbaink - Hamilton Academical and St Johnstone - 2013–14, 2015
Justin Johnson - Dundee United - 2015–16
Marc Klok - Dundee and Ross County - 2013–14, 2017
Kevin Luckassen - Ross County - 2013–14
Darren Maatsen - Ross County - 2013–15
Victor Nirennold - Motherwell - 2021-22
Kelle Roos - Aberdeen - 2022–present
Alex Schalk - Ross County - 2015–18
Sherwin Seedorf - Motherwell - 2019–21
Rodney Sneijder - Dundee United - 2015
Yordi Teijsse - Dundee - 2016–17
Jeroen Tesselaar - Kilmarnock and St Mirren - 2013–15
Kenny van der Weg - Hamilton Academical and Ross County - 2016–18, 2019
Virgil van Dijk - Celtic - 2013–15
Kevin van Veen - Motherwell - 2021–present
Randy Wolters - Dundee - 2017–18

New Zealand

Rory Fallon - St Johnstone - 2013–14
Alex Greive - St Mirren - 2022–present
George Stanger - Hamilton Academical - 2018–21

Nigeria

Ola Adeyemo - Dundee United - 2014–15
Efe Ambrose - Celtic and Hibernian - 2013–19
Joe Aribo - Rangers - 2019–22
Leon Balogun - Rangers - 2020–22
Calvin Bassey - Rangers - 2020–22
Reuben Gabriel - Kilmarnock - 2013–14
Rabiu Ibrahim - Kilmarnock - 2013–14
Chidiebere Nwakali - Aberdeen - 2018
Edward Ofere - Dundee United, Inverness Caledonian Thistle - 2015, 2016
Juwon Oshaniwa - Hearts of Midlothian - 2015–17
Umar Sadiq - Rangers - 2018

North Macedonia
Bojan Miovski - Aberdeen - 2022–present

Norway

Torbjørn Agdestein - Inverness Caledonian Thistle - 2013–14
Kristoffer Ajer - Celtic, Kilmarnock - 2017–21
Jo Inge Berget - Celtic - 2014
Mohamed Elyounoussi - Celtic - 2019–21
Markus Fjørtoft - Hamilton Academical - 2019–20
Runar Hauge - Hibernian - 2021-22
Sondre Solholm Johansen - Motherwell - 2021–present
Elias Melkersen - Hibernian - 2022–present
Stefan Johansen - Celtic - 2014–2016
Bjørn Johnsen - Heart of Midlothian - 2016–17

Poland

Błażej Augustyn - Heart of Midlothian - 2015–16
Radosław Cierzniak - Dundee United - 2013–15
Kevin Dąbrowski - Hibernian - 2021–22
Jarosław Fojut - Dundee United - 2014–15
Rafał Grzelak - Heart of Midlothian - 2017–18
Krystian Nowak - Heart of Midlothian - 2016–17
Max Stryjek - Livingston - 2020-22
Michał Szromnik - Dundee United - 2014–16
Łukasz Załuska - Celtic - 2013–15

Portugal

Bruno Alves - Rangers - 2017–18
Daniel Candeias - Rangers - 2017–19
Fábio Cardoso - Rangers - 2017–18
Dálcio - Rangers - 2017
Jota - Celtic - 2021–present
Joel Castro Pereira  - Heart of Midlothian - 2019–20
Jair Tavares - Hibernian - 2022–present

Romania
Laurențiu Brănescu - Kilmarnock - 2019–20
Laurențiu Corbu - St Mirren - 2019
Ianis Hagi - Rangers - 2020–present
Mihai Popescu - St Mirren - 2019

Russia
Ivan Konovalov - Livingston - 2022–present

Saint Kitts and Nevis
Harry Panayiotou - Livingston - 2021

Senegal

Morgaro Gomis - Dundee United, Heart of Midlothian, Motherwell - 2013–16
Jean Alassane Mendy - Dundee - 2018–19

Serbia

Stefan Šćepović - Celtic - 2014–16

Sierra Leone

Mustapha Dumbuya - Partick Thistle - 2015–18

Slovakia

Erik Čikoš - Ross County - 2014, 2016–17
Marián Kello - St Mirren - 2013–15
Filip Kiss - Ross County - 2014–15
Milan Lalkovič - Ross County - 2017

Slovenia

Uroš Celcer - Ross County - 2014
Andraž Struna - Heart of Midlothian - 2017

South Africa

Keaghan Jacobs - Livingston - 2018–22
Kyle Jacobs - Kilmarnock - 2013–14
Bongani Zungu - Rangers - 2020-21

South Korea

Oh Hyeon-gyu - Celtic - 2023-

South Sudan
William Akio - Ross County - 2022–present

Spain

Arturo - Dundee - 2016
Jon Aurtenetxe - Dundee - 2017–18 
Julen Etxabeguren - Dundee - 2015–18
Jesús García - Hamilton Academical - 2013–17
Juanma - Heart of Midlothian - 2015–17
Dani López - Inverness Caledonian Thistle - 2015–16
Rubén Palazuelos - Ross County - 2015
Miguel Pallardó - Heart of Midlothian - 2014–16
Antonio Reguero - Ross County - 2014–15
Alex Rodriguez - Motherwell - 2018–19
Jon Toral - Rangers - 2017

Sweden

John Guidetti - Celtic - 2014–15
Melker Hallberg - Hibernian, St Johnstone - 2019–present
Filip Helander - Rangers - 2019–present
David Moberg Karlsson - Kilmarnock - 2014
Mikael Lustig - Celtic - 2013–19
Viktor Noring - Heart of Midlothian - 2016–18
William Sandford - St Johnstone - 2022–present
Osman Sow - Heart of Midlothian, Kilmarnock - 2014–16, 2019–21
Carl Starfelt - Celtic - 2021–present

Switzerland

Albian Ajeti - Celtic - 2020–present
Saidy Janko - Celtic - 2015–17
Florian Kamberi - Hibernian - 2018–20
Mihael Kovačević - Ross County - 2013–14
Branislav Mićić - Ross County - 2013–14
Orhan Mustafi - Ross County - 2013–14
Philippe Senderos - Rangers -  2016–17
Benjamin Siegrist - Dundee United - 2020–present

Togo

Steve Lawson - Livingston - 2018–21

Trinidad and Tobago

Daniel Phillips - St Johnstone - 2022–present
Jason Scotland - Hamilton Academical - 2014–15
Richard Roy - Hamilton Academical - 2016–17

Tunisia

Sofien Moussa - Dundee - 2017–19
Aymen Souda - Livingston - 2019–20

Turkey

Nadir Çiftçi - Celtic, Dundee United and Motherwell - 2013–18
İlkay Durmuş - St Mirren - 2019–21
Colin Kazim-Richards - Celtic - 2016
Alim Öztürk - Heart of Midlothian - 2014–17
Rıdvan Yılmaz - Rangers - 2022–present

Uganda

Sadat Anaku - Dundee United - 2022–present
Bevis Mugabi - Motherwell - 2019–present

Ukraine
Max Kucheriavyi - St Johnstone - 2022–present
Mykola Kukharevych - Hibernian - 2022–present
Marian Shved - Celtic - 2019

United States

Cameron Carter-Vickers - Celtic - 2021–present
Joseph Efford - Motherwell - 2022–present
Ian Harkes - Dundee United - 2020–present
Matthew Hoppe - Hibernian - 2023-
Emerson Hyndman - Rangers and Hibernian - 2017–18
Perry Kitchen - Hearts - 2016–17
Chris Mueller - Hibernian - 2021-22
Matt Polster - Rangers - 2019–20
Dante Polvara - Aberdeen - 2022–present
Christian Ramirez - Aberdeen - 2021–present
James Sands - Rangers - 2022–present
Sebastian Soto - Livingston F.C. - 2021-22
Malik Tillman - Rangers - 2022–present

Uruguay
Diego Laxalt - Celtic - 2020–21

Venezuela
Ronald Hernández - Aberdeen - 2020–21

Zambia
Fashion Sakala - Rangers - 2021–present

Zimbabwe

Kundai Benyu - Celtic - 2017
David Moyo - Hamilton Academical - 2019–21

See also
List of foreign Scottish Premier League players

Notes

{{Cnote2|b MKD|Born in North Macedonia

{{Cnote2|b RSA|Born in South Africa

References

 
Foreign players
Scottish Premiership
Association football player non-biographical articles